Joílson Bernardo da Silva (born 29 August 1987) is a Brazilian former athlete who specialised in middle and long-distance running events.

A native of Fortaleza, de Silva started training in athletics as a 15-year old on the streets of his local neighbourhood, running bare-foot as he couldn't afford to buy sneakers. Once he was picked up by a state government program he began training on tracks. In 2004 he was the South American Youth Champion in the 3000 metres event. His best result in senior athletics was a third-place finish in the 5000 metres at the 2011 Pan American Games in Guadalajara, where he edged out Mexico's Juan Carlos Romero by two hundredths of a second to claim the bronze medal.

References

External links

1987 births
Living people
Brazilian male middle-distance runners
Brazilian male long-distance runners
Sportspeople from Fortaleza
Pan American Games bronze medalists for Brazil
Pan American Games medalists in athletics (track and field)
Medalists at the 2011 Pan American Games
Athletes (track and field) at the 2011 Pan American Games
South American Games silver medalists for Brazil
South American Games medalists in athletics
Competitors at the 2014 South American Games